The Central Bar bombing was a bomb attack on a pub in the town of Gilford near Portadown in County Down in Northern Ireland on 31 December 1975. The attack was carried out by members of the Irish National Liberation Army (INLA) using the covername "People's Republican Army". Three Protestant civilians were killed in the bombing.

Background
A lot of members of the Official IRA (OIRA) were not happy with a ceasefire the group called in 1972 and in December 1974 the dissenters in the OIRA set up the Irish National Liberation Army (INLA) and a political wing called the Irish Republican Socialist Party (IRSP).

1975 was one of the worst years of "The Troubles" for attacks with civilian casualties with Loyalist paramilitaries carrying out attacks including the Strand Bar Bombing, the Miami Showband killings and the attacks at Donnellys bar and Kays tavern. And Republican paramilitaries carrying out attacks including the Mountainview Tavern attack, the Bayardo Bar and the Tullyvallen Orange Hall massacre. All of these attacks saw high numbers of civilian deaths and injuries.

On 15 December 1975 the Ulster Volunteer Force (UVF) killed Ronald Trainor a 17-year-old member of the IRSP after a bomb attack on his house in Ballyoran Park in Portadown.

The bombing
Henry MacDonald and Jack Holland said that it seemed the attack was in revenge for the killing of Trainor two weeks earlier.

On 31 December (New Year's Eve) 1975 an INLA unit planted a time bomb in a duffel bag in the Central Bar pub in the mainly Protestant town of Gilford near Portadown.

The bomb went off at around 21:00. The explosion killed three Protestant civilians, Richard Beattie (44), William Scott (28) and Sylvia McCullough (31) who died of her injuries the day after. Around 30 people were injured in the bombing and were taken to the Craigavon Area Hospital by ambulances.

Conviction
A 29-year-old Portadown INLA member Francis Corry was given 4 life sentences in December 1979 for the three Central Bar killings and for that of 14-year-old Portadown boy, Thomas Rafferty killed by a booby-trap bomb in February 1976.

Aftermath
On 5 January 1976, just six days after the bar bombing ten Protestant workmen were shot dead and one badly injured by a group calling itself the South Armagh Republican Action Force near Kingsmill in Armagh. This attack left 10 Protestant civilians dead. The night before that attack on the 4 January 1976, the UVF killed six Catholics in two separate attacks.

See also
Darkley killings
Droppin Well bombing
Irish People's Liberation Organization
Timeline of Irish National Liberation Army actions

Sources
Jack Holland, Henry McDonald, INLA – Deadly Divisions'
CAIN project

References

1975 in Northern Ireland
1975 murders in the United Kingdom
1970s in County Down
Building bombings in Northern Ireland
Attacks on bars in Northern Ireland
December 1975 crimes
December 1975 events in the United Kingdom
Explosions in 1975
Explosions in County Down
Improvised explosive device bombings in Northern Ireland
Irish National Liberation Army actions
Murder in County Down
Terrorist incidents in County Down
Terrorist incidents in the United Kingdom in 1975
1970s murders in Northern Ireland
1975 crimes in Ireland